Robert P. Alexander (November 26, 1904 – August 24, 1985) of Washington, D.C., was a collector and expert on Japanese classic postage stamps.

Collecting interests
Although his collecting interests covered the entire scope of stamps and postal history of Japan, he studied and became expert in certain issues, such as the Dragon issues.

Philatelic activity
Alexander wrote articles on specific aspects and postal issues of Japanese philately. He was a founder of the International Society for Japanese Philately in 1946 and once served as its president during his forty years with the society. He was also editor and contributor to Japanese Philately from 1950 to 1955.

Honors and awards
Robert Alexander was inducted into the American Philatelic Society Hall of Fame in 1986.

See also
 Philately
 Philatelic literature

References
 Robert P. Alexander at APS Hall of Fame

1904 births
1985 deaths
Philatelic literature
American philatelists
People from Washington, D.C.
American Philatelic Society